Giovanni Preziosi (24 October 1881, in Torella dei Lombardi – 26 April 1945, in Milan) was an Italian fascist politician noted for his contributions to Fascist Italy.

Early career
Born into a middle-class family, he joined the priesthood after completing his studies and, although he was defrocked in 1911, he remained a lifelong adherent of conservative Catholicism. He then followed a career in journalism, founding the Vita Italiana all'estero as a magazine for emigrants. This was followed by his journal La Vita Italiana, which was noted for its harsh criticism of Jews in the run-up to World War I. He soon became involved in Fascist political circles, eventually becoming a member of Benito Mussolini's fascists and taking part in the March on Rome.

Antisemitism 
Preziosi was not initially antisemitic but after Italy's poor returns for the involvement in the First World War he came to blame Jewish elements in Italy for many of its ills. He argued the Jews were incapable of being racially and spiritually Italian due to what he considered to be their "double loyalties" and the growth of Zionism and believed in the notions that Jews were behind communism, Freemasonry, capitalism and democracy. Much of his thought was influenced by La Libre Parole, a newspaper founded by Edouard Drumont, Howell Arthur Gwynne's The Cause of World Unrest and The Dearborn Independent of Henry Ford. He became the first to translate The Protocols of the Elders of Zion into Italian in 1921. Such were the strength of his beliefs that Preziosi criticized a contemporary antisemitic critic Paolo Orano for his 'soft' stance on Jews.

Initially, although a hardliner in terms of his fascism, he denounced Nazism as parochial, exclusionary and responsible for pushing Europe towards communism. In fact in his early years he had demonstrated a strong Germanophobia, even producing a book entitled Germania alla Conquista dell'Italia in 1916. However, from 1933 onward, he changed tack, becoming a strong advocate of close co-operation with Nazi Germany and occasionally criticized Italian fascism for its lack of emphasis on perceived Jewish wrongdoings. His views reached a wider audience after the passing of the Italian Racial Laws as he began to write articles for the national press as well as his own journal.

Preziosi also wrote "Ecco il diavolo: Israele".

Later career 
In 1923, Preziosi coadiuvated the Italian nationalist Ettore Tolomei in preparing the manifesto called the Provvedimenti per l'Alto Adige ("Measures for the Alto Adige"), becoming the blueprint for the Italianization of South Tyrol campaign. Preziosi's growing prestige was rewarded in 1942 when he was made a minister of state. Following the formation of the puppet state of the Italian Social Republic Preziosi was initially moved to Nazi Germany where he was to serve as Adolf Hitler's adviser on Italian affairs. Whilst in Germany he also had a show on Radio Munich, which was broadcast to Mussolini's Italy, and used it as a platform to attack the likes of Guido Buffarini Guidi and Alessandro Pavolini as "Jew lovers".

He returned to Italy in March 1944 to head up an Ispettorato Generale della Razza (General Inspectorate of Race).
In this role he introduced a system based on the Nuremberg Laws and used the new code to crack down on Jewish elements which were deemed unacceptable. Along with Roberto Farinacci he also became a close ally of Julius Evola during this period in a pro-fascistic alliance. Preziosi's activities were at times frustrated by Mussolini, who held a long-standing personal hatred for this "former priest", but Preziosi's efforts still ensured that the puppet Italian state would be involved in the Nazi war effort.

In the late days of the war, following a narrow escape from Partisans on the 26 April 1945, Preziosi fled on foot with his wife Valeria to the city of Milan where they found refuge in the homes of friends.  The next day they were found to have taken their own lives by throwing themselves out of a fourth floor window. In his farewell letter Preziosi wrote:

References 

1881 births
1945 deaths
Antisemitism in Italy
Catholicism and far-right politics
Christian fascists
Italian radio presenters
Italian male writers
Italian politicians who committed suicide
Holocaust perpetrators in Italy
Officials of Nazi Germany
Roman Catholic conspiracy theorists
People from the Province of Avellino
People of the Italian Social Republic
Protocols of the Elders of Zion
Suicides by jumping in Italy
Suicides in Milan
20th-century Italian Roman Catholic priests
Italian conspiracy theorists
1945 suicides